The George Hotel in Huddersfield, West Yorkshire, England, is a Grade II listed building famous as the birthplace of rugby league football in 1895. The 60 bed hotel was built in 1851 and closed in January 2013, with the receivers looking for a new buyer.

The three-star rated George Hotel, which has an Italianate façade, was designed by William Walker. The Victorian era hotel was built around 1851.

Birth of Rugby League

It was in the George Hotel, Huddersfield on 29 August 1895 that 21 Lancashire and Yorkshire clubs held a meeting and by a majority of 20 to 1 voted to secede from the Rugby Football Union to set up their own Northern Rugby Football Union. In 1922 this became the Rugby Football League.

Stockport was also accepted into the league via telephone to the hotel.

Memorabilia recalling the meeting can be found throughout the hotel as well as in the Heritage Centre.

British Amateur Rugby League Association

The British Amateur Rugby League Association (BARLA) was also founded at the George Hotel in 1973.

Rugby League Heritage Centre

The Rugby League Heritage Centre was located in the basement of the George. It was the UK’s only rugby league heritage museum. It was the brainchild of sports presenter Mike Stephenson.

The Rugby League Heritage centre was opened on 30 August 2005 by former players Billy Boston, Neil Fox and Mick Sullivan.

Within the centre were displays of memorabilia, including rare jerseys, medals, caps, programmes and photographs. There was also footage played on several plasma screens. The British Rugby League Hall of Fame is now located in the Heritage Centre.

National Rugby League Museum
On 24 June 2020 Rugby League Cares announced a partnership with Kirklees Council to establish a National Rugby League Museum in the George Hotel.

Filmography

In 2019, The George Hotel was 'set alight' by film crew for the new sky programme Cobra, a six part series aired on Sky One in 2020.

See also 
Grade II* listed buildings in Kirklees
Listed buildings in Huddersfield (Newsome Ward - central area)

References

External links

 Official George Hotel site
 Official Rugby League Heritage Centre site
 360° view of the Founders' Room, George Hotel, Huddersfield

Rugby league in England
Rugby league museums and halls of fame
Sport in Huddersfield
Buildings and structures in Huddersfield
Grade II listed buildings in West Yorkshire
Grade II listed hotels
Tourist attractions in Huddersfield
Sports museums in England
History of rugby league
Hotels in West Yorkshire
Rugby football culture
Defunct museums in England
2005 establishments in England
Museums established in 2005